Semisi Masirewa (born 9 June 1992) is a Fijian-born Japanese rugby union player who currently plays as an outside back for the  in the international Super Rugby competition.

Career 
Masirewa moved to New Zealand in 2010 after receiving a scholarship to attend Wanganui High School. He went on to move to Feilding High School, following another scholarship, for his final year of education. After finishing school Masirewa moved North to the Waikato to join some family members. This came as a result of at the time the Manawatu union showed no interest in him. After playing eleven games for Waikato Masirewa was mainly involved in development squads. He was then loaned to Manawatu to provide injury cover. He played both sevens and 15-a-side formats for the province. Based on his form he was offered a two-year Super Rugby contract by the Western Force starting the next season, in 2016.

He then signed a two-year deal to play for Kintetsu Liners in Japan. Furthermore, he was also called up to play for the Japanese-based Sunwolves in Super Rugby during the 2018 season.

Personal 
Masirewa has three siblings. His father died while he attended Feilding High School. Masirewa and his wife, Lara, have a young son named Fletcher.

Super Rugby statistics

References

1992 births
Living people
Fijian rugby union players
Rugby union fullbacks
Rugby union wings
Waikato rugby union players
Manawatu rugby union players
Western Force players
People educated at Wanganui High School
People educated at Feilding High School
Fijian emigrants to New Zealand
Fijian expatriate rugby union players
Sunwolves players
Japan international rugby union players
Perth Spirit players
Hanazono Kintetsu Liners players